Sprouse-Reitz is a defunct chain of five-and-dime stores based in Portland, Oregon, United States.  The Sprouse-Reitz Company was founded in 1909 in Tacoma, Washington. At its peak it had more than 470 stores in eleven states in the Western United States.

Around January 1989, the declining retailer tried to revive its business by rebranding its stores "Sprouse!". In June 1990, with the store count at 287, CEO Robert Sprouse II, who controlled about 80 percent of the company's voting stock, said that chain would change its focus to six specific areas: toys, housewares, crafts, home furnishings, family apparel, greeting cards, wrapping paper, and other paper products. In late 1990, the chain was sold for $22.9 million to SR Partners, Inc., a joint venture among realtors TransAction Financial Corp., acquisition specialists First San Francisco Holdings, Ltd., and individual investors.

In December 1993, Sprouse-Reitz Inc. liquidated and closed its remaining 84 stores after failing to find a buyer. The company estimated that the last stores would close in February. As of late February 1994, the last stores were scheduled to close on March 20.

Gallery

References

External links

Sprouse store in Red Bluff, California in 1947

Defunct companies based in Oregon
Five and dimes
Retail companies established in 1909
Retail companies disestablished in 1994
Companies formerly listed on the Nasdaq
Defunct retail companies of the United States
History of Portland, Oregon
1909 establishments in Oregon
1994 disestablishments in Oregon
Companies based in Portland, Oregon